The plaintive rain frog or rough rain frog (Breviceps verrucosus) is a species of frog in the family Brevicipitidae.
It is found in Lesotho, South Africa, and Eswatini.
Its natural habitats are temperate forests, dry savanna, temperate shrubland, temperate grassland, and rural gardens.
It is threatened by habitat loss.

References

Breviceps
Frogs of Africa
Amphibians of South Africa
Amphibians described in 1842
Taxonomy articles created by Polbot